Diospyros subtruncata is a tree in the family Ebenaceae. Inflorescences bear up to three flowers. The specific epithet  is from the Latin meaning "somewhat truncated", referring to the calyx. Habitat is lowland mixed dipterocarp forests from sea level to  altitude. D. subtruncata is found in Sumatra and Borneo.

References

subtruncata
Plants described in 1905
Trees of Sumatra
Trees of Borneo